was a Japanese film and stage actress.

Biography
After graduating from the Takarazuka Music and Dance School, Aratama joined the Takarazuka Revue in 1945. She gave her film debut in 1951, but it was not before 1955 that she left the Takarazuka Revue, signing first with Nikkatsu film studios, then, after her contract expired, with Toho. She worked for directors such as Mikio Naruse, Yasujirō Ozu and Masaki Kobayashi, appearing in films like The Human Condition, The End of Summer, Kwaidan and 47 Ronin. Since the late 1970s, she concentrated solely on stage and television work. Due to health problems, she reduced her appearances after 1994. She died of heart failure in 2001.

Selected filmography

Films

Television

Awards
Michiyo Aratama received the Blue Ribbon Award for Best Supporting Actress for The Human Condition and Watashi wa kai ni naritai, and the Kinema Junpo Award for Best Actress for The Human Condition. She was awarded the Mainichi Film Concour for Best Supporting Actress for The End of Summer and Minami no kaze to nami.

References

External links
 
 

1930 births
2001 deaths
20th-century Japanese actresses